Bithynia pygmaea is a species of freshwater snail with a gill and an operculum, an aquatic gastropod mollusk in the family Bithyniidae. It may be threatened by damming of Mekong (both current and planned) and water pollution from industrialisation.

Distribution 
The native distribution of this species includes:
 Malaysia
 Burma
 Thailand

The non-native distribution of this species includes the United States.

References

External links 
 Chitramvong Y. P. (1991). "The Bithyniidae (Gastropoda: Prosobranchla) of Thailand: comparative internal anatomy. Walkerana 5(14): 161-206. PDF.

Bithyniidae
Gastropods described in 1908